Jaluiticola is a genus of jumping spiders endemic to the Marshall Islands. Its only species is Jaluiticola hesslei.

References

Salticidae
Endemic fauna of the Marshall Islands
Monotypic Salticidae genera
Spiders of Oceania
Taxa named by Carl Friedrich Roewer